Solid Brass is the second and final studio album by the band Circus Lupus. It was released by Dischord Records in 1993; its catalog number is DIS79.

Track listing

"Right Turn Clyde"
"7 x 4 x 1"
"I Always Thought You Were An Asshole"
"And You Won"
"New Cop Car"
"Texas Minute"
"Deviant Gesture Catalog"
"Takes About an Hour: Epilepsy"
"Pop Man"
"Heathen"
"Pop Man"
"Pressure Point"

References

1993 albums
Circus Lupus albums